Huimin is a town in Lancang Lahu Autonomous County, Yunnan, China.

Administrative division
As of 2016, the town is divided into five villages: 
 Hanguping
 Fula
 Mangyun
 Jingmai
 Mangjing

History
It was incorporated as a township in 1984. It officially designated an "ethnic township" until an administrative reorganisation in 1988. On December 28, 2012, it was upgraded to a town.

Geography
The town is located in southeastern Lancang Lahu Autonomous County, which known as the "South Gate" of the county. It is surrounded by Jiujing Hani Ethnic Township on the north, Nuofu Township on the west, Fazhanhe Hani Ethnic Township on the east, and Menghai County on the south. 

The town a mountainous area.

There are several rivers and streams in the town, such as Nanlang River, Nanwang River, Fula River, Nanmen River, Menglei River, Mangqing River, and Nanxiong River.

Economy
Agriculture and mineral resources play important roles in the local economy. The main crops of the region are grains and corns. Commercial crops include sugarcane, mango, longan, tea, and natural rubber. The region also has an abundance of iron, coal, manganese, and limestone.

Demographics

As of 2018, the National Bureau of Statistics of China estimates the town's population now to be 17,000.

Tourist attractions
An ancient tea garden is a popular attraction in the town.

Transportation
The China National Highway 214 passes across the town north to south.

References

Bibliography

Towns of Pu'er City
Divisions of Lancang Lahu Autonomous County